The Archdiocese of Vad, Feleac and Cluj is an episcopal see of the Romanian Orthodox Church. Cathedral of this archbishopric is the Dormition of the Theotokos Cathedral in Cluj.

Bishops and Archbishops
 Nicolae Ivan (1921-1936)
 Nicolae Colan (1936-1957)
 Teofil Herineanu (1957-1992)
 Bartolomeu Anania (1993-2011)
 Andrei Andreicuț (2011-)

Vad